The 2015 Japanese Super Cup was held on 28 February 2015 between the 2014 J.League champions Gamba Osaka and the 2014 J.League runner-up Urawa Red Diamonds. 

This was both clubs' third encounter in the Super Cup, Urawa having won in 2006 and Gamba in 2007. Gamba won the match 2–0 after a goal each by Takashi Usami and Patric.

Match

Statistics

References

Japanese Super Cup
Super
Gamba Osaka matches
Urawa Red Diamonds matches
Sport in Yokohama